Marcus Reginald Bloom (24 September 1907 – 6 November 1944) was a British Special Operations Executive agent during the Second World War.

Early life 
Bloom was born in 1907 in Brick Lane, Whitechapel (as per his birth certificate) but the family later moved to Tottenham, London, the son of Harry Pizer Bloom and Anna Sadie Davidoff Bloom, in an orthodox Jewish home. He helped out working at his father’s cinema in Wandsworth, their mail order textile firm, or in their restaurant business.

In the 1930s his father sent him Paris to run the mail-order business, and he became fluent in French. The firm closed after five years and he returned to London and married in March 1938.

World War II 
He served in the Royal Artillery in 1941 and joined the Special Operations Executive in February 1942.

On the night of 3/4 November 1942 he was landed at Port Miou, near Cassis in southern France, with SOE agents George Starr, organiser of WHEELWRIGHT; Mary Herbert, courier for SCIENTIST; Marie-Thérèse Le Chêne, courier for SPRUCE; and Odette Sansom for SPINDLE.

He became wireless operator in the PRUNUS network organised by Maurice Pertschuk, with Philippe de Gunzbourg  as courier. Bloom worked very successfully and sent and received many messages to and from London (estimated at over fifty), having to keep constantly on the move to avoid the German radio detection vans. He also assisted in sending and receiving messages for Starr in the WHEELWRIGHT network.

Philippe de Gunzbourg noted that  Pertschuk had a reckless lack of security, with resistance leaders sharing tables in black-market restaurants in Toulouse and speaking in English, and on 12 April 1943 Pertschuk, Bloom, and several of their key colleagues were arrested. They were possibly betrayed by double agent Roger Bardet.  The network collapsed though de Gunzbourg escaped and transferred to the WHEELWRIGHT network. Pertschuk was deported to Buchenwald and executed.

Bloom was taken to Fresnes prison and Avenue Foch in Paris and severely beaten but revealed nothing. In August 1944 he was deported to Mauthausen and executed on 6 November 1944.

"Lt Marcus R Bloom Mentioned in Despatches Jewish secret agent of the Special Operations Executive (SOE) lived at 9 Brownlow Court. Captured and murdered in Mauthausen Concentration Camp, 1944. Be Strong and of Good Courage (Joshua 1:9) Hebrew Text (Jewish American Society for Historic Preservation and AJEX U.K.)"

Recognition

Awards 

 United Kingdom: Mentioned in Despatches

Monuments 

 He is honoured at The Valençay SOE Memorial, Indre, as one of the 104 agents of section F who lost their lives for France’s liberation.
 Brookwood Memorial, Surrey. Panel 21 Column 3.
 On a plaque on his mother’s grave at Edmonton Federation Synagogue cemetery, Montague Road, London.
 On the War Memorial of the St John’s Wood Synagogue in Grove End Road, London.
Memorial at Mauthausen camp.
A memorial plaque at Brownlow Court, Hampstead, erected in 2022 by the Jewish American Society for Historic Preservation and AJEX -U.K.

References

Further reading 

 MRD Foot, SOE in France an account of the work of the British Special Operations Executive in France, 1940–1944, HMSO, London, 1966.
 Secret Flotillas: the Clandestine Sea Lines to France and French North Africa, Brooks Richards,  HMSO, 1996.
 
Marcus Bloom, SOE agent, Jewish Virtual library, by Martin Sugarman, based on several interviews of witnesses; and same chapter in 'Fighting Back', by Martin Sugarman, 2017

1907 births
1944 deaths
Military personnel from London
Royal Artillery soldiers
British Special Operations Executive personnel
British people executed in Nazi concentration camps
British Army personnel killed in World War II
 English Jews
 English expatriates in France
People from Tottenham
British Army General List officers